Joseph Rosenstock (in Kraków in New York City) was an American conductor.

Career

Early years
He was brought into the Metropolitan Opera in New York City to replace Artur Bodanzky in 1928. However, he received such poor critical reviews that he himself resigned after only six performances and Bodanzky was brought back.

, 1933–1936

Tokyo, 1936–1946
Rosenstock left Berlin in 1936 and moved to Japan to conduct the Japan Symphony Orchestra (which had been founded in 1926 and became the NHK Symphony Orchestra in 1951).  He remained in Tokyo until 1946 and, while he was there, he taught Hideo Saito (conductor, educator and co-founder of the Toho Gakuen School of Music), Masashi Ueda (conductor of the Tokyo Symphony Orchestra, who introduced contemporary Russian, American and Japanese music to the public), and Roh Ogura how to conduct Beethoven's symphonies.

New York, 1948–1969
In 1951, he notably conducted the world premieres of David Tamkin's The Dybbuk.

In January 1952 Rosenstock succeeded Laszlo Halász as General Director of the NYCO. He served in that post for four seasons, continuing Halász's innovative programming of unusual repertoire mixed with standard works. He led the world premiere of Aaron Copland's The Tender Land, the New York premiere of William Walton's Troilus and Cressida, and the United States premieres of Gottfried von Einem's The Trial and Béla Bartók's Bluebeard's Castle. Rosenstock was also the first NYCO director to include musical theater in the company's repertoire with a 1954 production of Jerome Kern and Oscar Hammerstein II's Show Boat. This decision was ridiculed by the press but Rosenstock felt justified as the production played to a packed house. Meanwhile, the company's production of Donizetti's opera Don Pasquale that season only sold 35 percent of the house seats.

During those eight years, he conducted 248 performances at the Metropolitan Opera, including a number of Metropolitan Opera radio broadcast performances.

References

1895 births
1985 deaths
19th-century Polish Jews
20th-century conductors (music)
20th-century male musicians
Jewish classical musicians
Jewish emigrants from Nazi Germany
Male conductors (music)
Musicians from Kraków
Opera managers
Polish conductors (music)
Polish emigrants to the United States
Polish expatriates in Germany
Polish expatriates in Japan